Music for Cats is the first solo album by cEvin Key released in 1998.

Track listing

All tracks composed by cEvin Key.

 "Musik für Cats" – 1:31
 "Wind on Small Paws" – 6:43
 "Meteorite" – 10:18
 "Bird" – 8:35
 "Blotter" – 4:29
 "Inside Jam World" – 5:55
 "Herbalist Rule" – 4:00
 "Greenhouse Gasses" – 5:32
 "Have You Ever Felt Like This?" – 5:28
 "Go Go Boots" – 5:13
 "Beauty Is the Enemy" – 4:29
 "Full Circle – 4:12
 "Grah Statikcat (Electrodes)" – 6:44

Personnel
cEvin Key - keyboards, bass guitar, drums, synths, guitar, sampler, circuit-bending
Dwayne Goettel - Synth, electronics on 2, 3, 6, 7, 8
Genesis P. Orridge - Vocals on 6, 9, 11
Mark Spybey - Electronics on 5
Phil Western - Synth on 10
Ashok Sarkar - Voice on 12
John West - Flute on 12

Release
The album was first time released on February 3, 1998 and is set for an re-release on 12 May 2015 over Artoffact Records in 2 LP vinyl version.

References

External links
Music For Cats at Discogs.com

1998 albums
CEvin Key albums